Robert P. Schumaker is an American academic and Professor of computer science at the University of Texas at Tyler, best known for creating AZFinText, a news-aware high-frequency stock trading system. Schumaker is also known as a Sports Analytics expert for his pioneering work using Twitter tweet sentiment to predict sports outcomes and is currently active in both prescription drug interactions and covid-19 vaccine allergies. Schumaker is also the founder and Director of the Data Analytics Lab.

Biography
Schumaker received a B.S. degree in Civil Engineering from the University of Cincinnati, an MBA in Management and International Business from the University of Akron and a Ph.D. in Management Information Systems from the University of Arizona.

While at the University of Arizona, Schumaker created the Arizona Financial Text (AZFinText) System which machine learns the words used in financial news articles to predict future stock prices.

Schumaker also works in the field of Sports Analytics authoring numerous papers on greyhound and harness racing prediction as well as using Twitter sentiment to predict Premier League and NFL matches. He has also authored a book on the subject, Sports Data Mining (2010).

He is the Past Editor of the Communications of the International Information Management Association journal (2010-2015), Associate Editor of Decision Support Systems and is a Fellow of the International Information Management Association (IIMA).

References

External links
 

University of Arizona alumni
University of Akron alumni
University of Cincinnati alumni
21st-century American engineers
Data miners
Living people
Year of birth missing (living people)